Benjamin Caldwell Cantwell (April 13, 1902 – December 4, 1962) was an American major league baseball pitcher from 1927 to 1937. He was born in Milan, Tennessee, and was a graduate of the University of Tennessee. He is the last MLB pitcher to lose 25 games in a single season (1935). He died, aged 60, in Salem, Missouri.

References

External links

1902 births
1962 deaths
Baseball players from Tennessee
Major League Baseball pitchers
Brooklyn Dodgers players
New York Giants (NL) players
Boston Braves players
Boston Bees players
Paris Parisians (KITTY League) players
Jackson Giants players
Sanford Celeryfeds players
Jacksonville Tars players
Jersey City Giants players
Montreal Royals players
Oakland Oaks (baseball) players
People from Milan, Tennessee
People from Salem, Missouri